Shelikan, also Ostrovok Shelikan, is a coastal islet in the Sea of Okhotsk near Magadan. It lies on the south side of Amakhton Bay.

Geography
Shelikan is located on the west side of Taui Bay and is separated from the continental shore by a 2.5 km wide sound. 
It is 122 m (400 ft) in height and is surrounded by shallow water.

Administratively this island is part of the Magadan Oblast.

Fauna

In the spring and summer one of the largest known colonies of slaty-backed gull in the Russian Far East is found on the island.

References

Islands of the Sea of Okhotsk
Islands of Magadan Oblast
Uninhabited islands of Russia